1496 Turku, provisional designation , is a Florian asteroid from the inner regions of the asteroid belt, approximately 8 kilometers in diameter. It was discovered on 22 September 1938, by astronomer Yrjö Väisälä at the Iso-Heikkilä Observatory in Turku, Finland. The asteroid was named for the Finnish city of Turku.

Orbit and classification 

Turku is a member of the Flora family, a giant asteroid family and the largest family of stony asteroids in the main belt. It is, however, a non-family asteroid from the main belt's background population when applying the Hierarchical Clustering Method to its proper orbital elements.

It orbits the Sun in the inner main-belt at a distance of 1.8–2.6 AU once every 3 years and 3 months (1,197 days). Its orbit has an eccentricity of 0.16 and an inclination of 3° with respect to the ecliptic.

Physical characteristics 

Turku is an assumed S-type asteroid, which is also the Flora family's overall spectral type.

Rotation period and poles 

In April 2006, a rotational lightcurve of Turku was obtained from photometric observations by French amateur astronomer Laurent Bernasconi. Lightcurve analysis gave a rotation period of 6.47 hours with a brightness amplitude of 0.51 magnitude, indicative of a non-spherical shape.

A 2016-published lightcurve, using modeled photometric data from the Lowell Photometric Database, gave a concurring period of 6.47375 hours, as well as a spin axis of (75.0°, −75.0°) in ecliptic coordinates (λ, β).

Diameter and albedo 

According to the survey carried out by the NEOWISE mission of NASA's Wide-field Infrared Survey Explorer, Turku measures between 7.47 and 7.973 kilometers in diameter and its surface has an albedo between 0.1930 and 0.347.

The Collaborative Asteroid Lightcurve Link assumes an albedo of 0.24 – derived from 8 Flora, the largest member and namesake of the Flora family – and calculates a diameter of 8.19 kilometers based on an absolute magnitude of 12.6.

Naming 

This minor planet was named after Finnish city of Turku, location of the discovering observatory and home of the discoverer Yrjö Väisälä. In ancient times, Turku was the capital of Finland. The official  was published by the Minor Planet Center in January 1956.

References

External links 
 Asteroid Lightcurve Database (LCDB), query form (info )
 Dictionary of Minor Planet Names, Google books
 Asteroids and comets rotation curves, CdR – Observatoire de Genève, Raoul Behrend
 Discovery Circumstances: Numbered Minor Planets (1)-(5000) – Minor Planet Center
 
 

001496
Discoveries by Yrjö Väisälä
Named minor planets
19380922